Christos Chiotis (born 12 July 1932), also transliterated as Khristos Khiotis, is a Greek long-distance runner. He competed in the men's 5000 metres at the 1960 Summer Olympics. He was named the 1958 Greek Athlete of the Year.

References

1932 births
Living people
Athletes (track and field) at the 1960 Summer Olympics
Greek male long-distance runners
Olympic athletes of Greece
Place of birth missing (living people)